Behexen is a Finnish black metal band founded in 1994. They adopted a more traditional approach to black metal by incorporating raw characteristics. Their first full-length release was Rituale Satanum, released in 2000 and followed by By the Blessing of Satan in 2004. They have also released a split with Horna (12" LP limited to 500 and CD 1000 copies) and a 3-vinyl set From the Devil's Chalice (limited to 666 copies).

Behexen toured Europe in 2005, as a support act to Archgoat.

Satanic ideology and influences
Behexen adopts to highly satanic lyrics and imagery. Vocalist and lyricist Hoath Torog identifies himself as a satanist. Torog explained in an interview following the release of their album Nightside Emanations, "Behexen is a magical tool and channel formed in 1995, which brings the voices of our gods to be heard, and works as an intermediary for their destructive emanations on this world. Our journey has taken nearly twenty years, and has included many phases, but today our temple shines the light of our lord brighter than ever before." Regarding Behexen's influences, Hoath stated very vaguely that everything "esoteric and exoteric that surrounds us can inspire us. Books, religions, magic, death, music...All the things that we hear, see and experience can feed our inspiration. I get influences from my own life and experiences amongst the occult. Black magic is a comprehensive part of my life, so it's natural that my inspiration comes from there."

Behexen's original name, Lords of the Left Hand, was inspired by a Samhain song title of the same name.

Discography

Albums 
 Rituale Satanum (2000)
 By the Blessing of Satan (2004)
 My Soul for His Glory (2008)
 Nightside Emanations (2012)
 The Poisonous Path (2016)

Demos and EPs 
1995: Reality Is in Evil...
1997: Eternal Realm
1998: Blessed Be the Darkness
2004: Behexen & Horna
2008: Behexen & Satanic Warmaster
2009: From the Devil's Chalice

Band members

Current members 
Horns - Drums (1994–present)
Hoath Torog - Vocals (1994–present)
Wraath - Guitars (2009–present)
Infection - Live Guitars (2009, 2016-2018), Guitars (2018–present)

Live musicians 
 Evisc - Bass (2013–present)

Former members 
Reaper – Guitars, Bass (1994–1999, 2004–2009)
Lunatic – Bass (1999–2004)
Veilroth – Guitars (1999–2004)
Gargantum – Guitar (1998–2009)
Lord Sargofagian – Bass (2009-2013)
Shatraug – Bass (2004-2008), Guitars (2009-2015)

Timeline

References

External links

Finnish black metal musical groups
Finnish musical groups
Musical groups established in 1994
1994 establishments in Finland